Ma'an News Agency (MNA) is a large wire service created in 2005 in the Palestinian territories. It is part of the Ma'an Network, a non-governmental organization media network created in 2002 in the Palestinian territories among independent journalists throughout the West Bank and Gaza Strip. It has partnerships with eight local television stations and twelve local radio stations. Ma'an News Agency publishes news 24 hours a day in Arabic, Hebrew and English, and claims to be one of the largest wire services in the Palestinian territories, with over three million visits per month. Ma'an News Agency also publishes feature stories, analysis and opinion articles. The agency's headquarters are based in Bethlehem and it has an office in Gaza.

History 
The Ma'an Network was launched in 2002 as a partnership between Bethlehem TV and local Palestinian media organizations. The name Ma'an is the Arabic word for "together". The group is run by Raed Othman, the former manager of Bethlehem TV. Ma'an has produced three soap operas (one of which, Mazih fi Jad (Joking Seriously), was described as the first television drama series produced in the Palestinian territories), numerous news and public affairs programs and the television film Kafah. Ma'an's programs are broadcast by ten independent terrestrial television stations in the West Bank and occasionally by the Fatah-run Palestine TV satellite broadcaster.

The Ma'an News Agency was launched in 2005 with funding from the Danish and Dutch Representative Offices to the Palestinian National Authority. The news agency is the most visible component of the Ma'an Network.

Independence 
Ma'an News Agency says that it "scrupulously maintains its editorial independence and aims to promote access to information, freedom of expression, press freedom, and media pluralism in Palestine." The Ma'an Network was founded with the goal of creating a media source that was free of factional control, unlike the major existing broadcasters such as Hamas' Al-Aqsa TV and Fatah's Palestine TV. In an interview with media scholar Matt Sienkiewicz, former Ma'an Chief financial officer Wisam Kutom stated that he told potential Ma'an funders that: "Palestinian television is factional television right now we [Palestinians] cannot tell the stories we want to, only the stories the factions will let us. There is no independent television".

Funding 
Funding for Ma'an Network comes from advertising revenue and from foreign donors.

2007 Threat from Hamas 
In July 2007, at the time the de facto Gaza Strip government, MNA alleged that MNA's chief editor had received "direct threats" from Hamas to carry out a "defamation campaign" against MNA, and to cease its criticism of "the Hamas movement".

Reach 
Ma'an News Agency describes itself as "the main source of independent news from Palestine" and "the premier source of independent Palestinian news on the internet". According to a 2007 survey, 95.6% of Palestinians with internet access "frequently visit" the site. As of December 2013, Ma'an News receives the fourth most site visitors in the Palestinian territories.

Reality TV 
In 2013, Ma'an TV (Ma'an Network's satellite channel) broadcast the hit reality show The President in collaboration with Search for Common Ground. Described as "a cross between American Idol and The Apprentice", audience members would vote through SMS to elect the show's young contestants who competed in mock press conferences, political campaigns, and debates.

Reliability 
An Israeli NGO, NGO Monitor, criticizes Ma'an for regularly re-publishing "non-verifiable or inaccurate claims" from partisan NGOs and for, "subjective, biased reporting." Palestinian Media Watch (PMW) criticized Ma'an for "sanitizing" its English-language reporting while publishing in Arabic reports that “include the hate ideology espoused by the terror organizations that deny Israel's right to exist [and] express reverence for suicide terrorists."  In further reports, PMW criticized Ma'an for "demonization of Jews," for publishing news stories in materially different Arabic and English versions, and for Holocaust denial.

According to The New York Times during the spate of Palestinian stabbing attacks against Israelis in 2015, Ma'an inaccurately reported that a young knife attacker had been "murdered" by Israeli police, (he was wounded and taken for treatment at Hadassah Hospital), "In a video report accusing Israel of faking evidence of other knife attacks, a reporter for the Palestinian news agency Ma'an described the clip as evidence of “murder” and claimed in her narration that the video showed the boy lying on the ground when “an Israeli occupation soldier shoots him in the head,” which it does not."

See also 
 Wafa
 Palestinian Information Center

References

External links 
 Ma'an News Agency
 Ma'an News Agency 

News agencies based in Palestine
Mass media in Bethlehem
Arabic-language websites
English-language websites
Multilingual websites
Palestinian news websites
2005 establishments in the Palestinian territories
Internet properties established in 2005